The Ersatz Corps was a corps level command of the German Army that existed briefly at the beginning of World War I.

History 
The Ersatz Corps was formed on 18 August 1914 under the command of 6th Army to control the Ersatz divisions of that army (Guards, 4th, 8th, 10th and 19th), hence the name of the Corps. General der Infanterie Ludwig von Falkenhausen was brought out of retirement to take command during its brief existence .

Ersatz is German for "replacement". Ersatz divisions were formed on mobilisation from replacement units of active regiments. Each brigade replacement battalion (Brigade-Ersatz-Bataillone) was numbered after its parent infantry brigade, and was formed with two companies taken from each of the brigade's replacement battalions (of which there was one per infantry regiment). Cavalry Ersatz Abteilungen and Field Artillery Ersatz Abteilungen were likewise formed from active cavalry and field artillery regiments.

Armee-Abteilung Falkenhausen was set up in the southern part of the Western Front in Alsace-Lorraine on 17 September 1914 from the parts of 6th Army that remained in Lorraine after the main body marched north to participate in the Race to the Sea. The Staff of the Ersatz Corps and its commander took command of the Armee-Abteilung and the Ersatz Corps ceased to exist.

See also 

German Army order of battle (1914)

References

Bibliography 
 
 
 
 
 

Corps of Germany in World War I
Military units and formations established in 1914
Military units and formations disestablished in 1914